The 2001 Tour de la Région Wallonne was the 28th edition of the Tour de Wallonie cycle race and was held from 3 to 8 August 2001. The race started in Mouscron and finished in Aubel. The race was won by Glenn D'Hollander.

General classification

References

Tour de Wallonie
Tour de la Région Wallonne